The Vancouver and District Waterfront Association was the union for longshoremen working on Vancouver's waterfront between 1923 and 1935.
It was established as a company union by the Shipping Federation of British Columbia after it defeated a strike and broke the local of the International Longshoremen's Association that previously represented the longshoremen.

Agitators from the Communist Party of Canada were elected to the union executive in 1933, linking it to the Workers' Unity League and thus transformed it into a militant union. The VDWWA was itself broken in 1935 after another waterfront strike in Vancouver.

See also

Battle of Ballantyne Pier
International Longshore and Warehouse Union
William Wasbrough Foster
Gerry McGeer

Further reading
 Madsen, Chris (2016). "Vancouver's Waterfront and Longshore Labour in 1918: Background Context to James Shaver Woodworth's On the Waterfront", The Northern Mariner/Le marine du nord, 26/1, 31-47.
 Madsen, Chris (2018). New Westminster Waterfront Strike - 1935, BC Labour Heritage Centre booklet and historical commemoration plaque.

History of British Columbia
History of Vancouver
Defunct trade unions in Canada
Organizations based in Vancouver
Port workers' trade unions

Trade unions established in 1923
Trade unions in British Columbia